Miina Äkkijyrkkä aka Liina Lång, originally Riitta Loiva (born July 2, 1949, in Iisalmi, Finland) is a Finnish artist. She is known for her paintings, drawings and sculptures. She is also a protector of Finncattle, the native Finnish dairy breed. She is known for her disdain for mainstream culture, and her actions have aroused controversy.

Personal life 
Äkkijyrkkä has three children. She stated in 2008 and 2009 that she is on the autism spectrum.

References

External links
 Examples of her art
 Article from Colossal provides some biographical information including educational background

1949 births
Living people
20th-century Finnish women artists
21st-century Finnish women artists
People from Iisalmi
20th-century Finnish sculptors
21st-century Finnish sculptors
Artists with autism